Eek & Meek is an American gag-a-day comic strip by Howie Schneider which ran from 1965 to 2000, syndicated by Newspaper Enterprise Association.

The strip featured the foibles of the two title characters. Eek, an aggressive alcoholic, was always seen with a bowler hat and a beard stubble. Meek was his timid sidekick. Supporting characters included Meek's love interest, Monique, rebellious kid Luvable and his friend Freaky.

The characters began as anthropomorphic mice, but morphed into humans as of the February 8, 1982, strip.

Collected editions
Eek & Meek (May 1969)  
Eek & Meek: One More Time (February 1970)  
Eek & Meek: Book Three (December 1970)

References

External links
Eek & Meek at Don Markstein's Toonopedia

1965 comics debuts
2000 comics endings
American comic strips
Comic strip duos
Fictional mice and rats
Fictional anthropomorphic characters
Fictional alcohol abusers
Gag-a-day comics